David S. Points (born May 16, 1954) is a former member of the Michigan House of Representatives.

Early life and education
Points was born on May 16, 1954, in Detroit, Michigan. Points earned a B.A. in English from Saginaw Valley State University. He then earned a J.D. from Ohio Northern University.

Career
Points served as in the United States Navy Reserve, earning the rank of lieutenant commander. Points worked as a teacher in Detroit Public Schools. Points formerly served as a court administrator and magistrate for the 30th District Court in Highland Park, Michigan. On November 3, 1992, Points was elected to the Michigan House of Representatives where he represented the 6th district from January 13, 1993, to December 31, 1994. On August 2, 1994, Points lost the Democratic primary that would have allowed him to run for re-election in the general election. He lost to Martha G. Scott, who would go on to win the general election and succeed him in the state house. On August 5, 2008, Points would again be defeated in a primary, this time for the 7th state house district.

Electoral history

References

Living people
1954 births
African-American state legislators in Michigan
Politicians from Detroit
Democratic Party members of the Michigan House of Representatives
Military personnel from Michigan
Saginaw Valley State University alumni
Ohio Northern University alumni
20th-century American politicians
20th-century African-American politicians
21st-century African-American people